Pterostylis spathulata, commonly known as the spoon-lipped rufous greenhood or Moora rustyhood is a plant in the orchid family Orchidaceae and is endemic to the south-west of Western Australia. Both flowering and non-flowering plants have a relatively large rosette of leaves. Flowering plants also have up to ten or more white and green or brown flowers with fine, upturned tips on the lateral sepals and a spoon-shaped, insect-like labellum.

Description
Pterostylis spathulata is a terrestrial,  perennial, deciduous, herb with an underground tuber and a rosette of between six and ten leaves. Flowering plants have a rosette at the base of the flowering stem but the leaves are usually withered by flowering time. Flowering occurs from September to November.

Taxonomy and naming
Pterostylis spathulata was first formally described in 1989 by Mark Clements from a specimen collected near Moora and the description was published in Australian Orchid Research. The specific epithet (spathulata) is derived from the Latin word spatha meaning "spoon" referring to the spoon-shaped labellum of this orchid.

Distribution and habitat
The spoon-lipped rufous greenhood grows in woodland and shrubland and on granite outcrops between Mullewa and the Fitzgerald River in the Avon Wheatbelt, Coolgardie, Mallee, Murchison, Swan Coastal Plain and Yalgoo biogeographic regions.

Conservation
Pterostylis spathulata  is classified as "not threatened" by the Western Australian Government Department of Parks and Wildlife.

References

spathulata
Endemic orchids of Australia
Orchids of Western Australia
Plants described in 1989